Grass Run is a stream in Ritchie County, West Virginia. It is a tributary of the Hughes River.

Grass Run was named for the swamp grass along its course.

See also
List of rivers of West Virginia

References

Rivers of Ritchie County, West Virginia
Rivers of West Virginia